Zadock Pratt Jr. (October 30, 1790 –  April 5, 1871) was a tanner, banker, soldier, and member of the United States House of Representatives. Pratt served in the New York militia from 1819–1826, and was Colonel of the 116th regiment from 1822 until his resignation from the militia on September 4, 1826.

In the Catskill Mountains, Pratt built the largest tannery in the world at its time, and built the town of Prattsville to accommodate the labor force necessary for the tannery, raising the town's population from around 500 to over 2000. Pratt was elected to the United States House of Representatives in 1836 and 1842. During his second term, in 1845 he first proposed the transcontinental railroad. In 1848, Pratt tried but failed to receive the Democratic/Hunker nomination for the 1848 New York state gubernatorial election. He was a delegate to the 1852 Democratic National Convention.

In 1843, Pratt established the Prattsville Bank with, which printed its own bills that were kept on par with the US dollar, but he closed the bank nine years later in 1852. Pratt financed multiple smaller tanneries in the Catskills, and also one in Pennsylvania as a joint venture with Jay Gould. In 1860 he retired from active business pursuits, and died in 1871, having survived four wives and his son.

Early life and family
Zadock Pratt was born on October 30, 1790, in Stephentown, New York, to Hannah Pratt (née Pickett) and Zadock Pratt Sr. He was the 5th of 7 children. In 1797, Pratt moved with his father's family to Middleburgh, New York. In 1802, at age 12, Pratt moved with his parents to Windham, New York (which soon became Lexington, and is current day Jewett). As a child, he received limited schooling at the public school, and instead worked on his father's farm and tannery. In his father's yard there were "two limes" and eight vats, and the bark was ground with a circular millstone by horse power.

In 1810, at age 20, Pratt became an apprentice to Luther Hayes, a sadler in Durham. Following his apprenticeship, he became a traveling saddler for a year, during which he saved $100. In 1812, he returned to Lexington where he continued his work as a saddler, working fourteen-hour days. In 1814, Pratt built a general store in Prattsville where he would barter with residents for goods, and would make periodic trips to New York City to trade the goods.

Pratt volunteered for the War of 1812 in 1814. He was a Steward of a company stationed at Brooklyn Heights. He was awarded $11 for his claim of arms and clothing which were destroyed during the war. In 1815, after war ended, he returned to Lexington, sold his store. On May 7, 1817, he entered the tanning business with  his older brother (Ezra) and his younger brother (Bennett).

On October 18, 1818, Pratt married Beda Dickerman of Hamden, Connecticut, who died of tuberculosis six months later on  April 19, 1819. Pratt and his brother Ezra then bought out Bennett's share of the tanning business for $2200.

During the winter of 1819–20, Pratt and three of his neighbors went on a trading expedition to Canada to sell their leather and other goods. They were successful, and traded their leather for gold and furs from Canadian settlers, and from Native Americans at Rice Lake. On his return, he stopped at the bank in Catskill, New York, where he learned that his tannery had burned down in his absence The building was uninsured, and was a loss of $1000; the cause was never determined. However, he resolved to rebuild it. Friends of the Pratt family donated money and it was quickly rebuilt.

In 1821, Pratt was appointed a magistrate of Lexington. In 1823, Pratt married Esther Dickerman, sister of his first wife. Esther died less than a year later on April 22, 1824, also of tuberculosis.

Pratt's tannery
Pratt had been planning a tanning business much larger than what he was currently engaged in, and Esther's death put him into action. He dissolved his partnership with his brother, and, with $14000 in capital, began seeking a location for his new tannery. He spent the summer of 1824 exploring the surrounding counties with his dog for the best place for his planned operations. He decided on a region in the very western part of Windham, in what is current day Prattsville, for its large forests of hemlock, which was necessary for tanning at the time, as well as its proximity to the Schoharie Creek. The Prattsville Commercial Building, built about 1824, listed on the National Register of Historic Places in 1996.

On October 24, he moved all of his belongings to the site and purchased the large meadow for $1300. The following day he broke ground on the tannery, and with the help of laborers, dammed the creek in the following weeks.

The tannery was 550' long, and 43' wide. There were 350 vats, 6 heaters, 12 leaches, two bark mills driven by a great wheel, and three hide mills.

Tannery foreman Osmer B. Wheeler later went on to open his own tannery, in Forestburgh, New York, and became a member of the New York State Senate.

Military and remarriages

On April 25, 1820, Pratt was chosen as Captain of the Fifth regiment of New York State Artillery, which consisted of 130 men. Acquired a cannon that had been used at the Battle of Plattsburgh for the regiment.
On July 12, 1822, he became a Colonel for New York's 116th Infantry. In 1825, he commanded the escort of Lafayette into Catskill.

On October 12, 1827, Pratt married his third wife, Abigail P. Watson, of Rensselaer. Their son was State Senator George W. Pratt (1830–1862).

On November 20, 1832, he applied to the State Legislature to divide Windham, and on March 8, 1833, Prattsville was divided off from Windham. At the time it had a population of around 1500.

On January 26, 1834, Pratt's second daughter, Abigail, was born. Pratt's wife died 10 days later on February 5, aged 26. On March 16, 1835, Pratt married his fourth wife, Mary E. Watson, sister of his third wife. Mary Pratt died in Providence, New York on July 17, 1868.

In 1836, he was elected to New York's 8th District, and in the same election, was voted to be and elector for New York.

In 1839, Westkill Lexington tannery burned down. He lost $10,000 but was only insured for $7,000.

Pratt offered to endow  Prattsville Academy with $5,000 if the sum were matched by a Christian church.

In 1842, he was elected to New York's 11th District. That same year, he established the  Prattsville Advocate newspaper. J. L. Hackstaff was the editor. In the same year, the Prattsville Academy was built. The land was donated by Pratt, and he provided half of the building costs.

In 1848, he received and honorary Master of the Arts degree from Union College. In 1852, he was elected as a delegate to the 1852 Democratic Convention.

Prattsville and his Tannery

First term as Congressman
In 1836, Pratt earned the Democratic nomination for New York's 8th congressional district. He won general election by just short of 3,000 votes. On September 10, 1837 Pratt was appointed to the Committee of the Militia, and on December 11, was appointed to the committee on public buildings.

On March 19, 1838, Pratt introduced a bill to drastically lower postage rates, and argued that high postage costs disproportionately affected the poor, and that it was effectively a tax on intelligence, as it hindered the free passage of information. The bill was passed. He felt so strongly about the price of postage that on his grave he had inscribed "WHILE MEMBER OF CONGRESS; MOVED THE REDUCTION OF POSTAGE; A.D. 1838".

On February 25, 1839, Pratt suggested that public buildings no longer be built out of sandstone, but instead granite of marble, because they absorb very little water compared to sandstone, and therefore required less maintenance He also noted that marble was cheaper than granite, when including building costs.

On July 4, 1838, he announced that he declined re-election, although his constituents strongly wanted him to serve another term.

March 18, 1839, Dry Dock in Brooklyn vs. Philadelphia.

Mint in New York vs. Philadelphia.

During his first term, Pratt never missed a session.

Second term as Congressman

Pratt did not intend to run for Congress again after declining to run for re-election following his first term as Congressman. However, in 1842 he accepted the nomination.

Legacy as a Congressman

As a congressman, Pratt pushed for legislation.
Reduce the cost of postage from $.25 to $.05 in 1838.
Create the Bureau of Engraving and Printing.
Construct public buildings in Washington, DC, of marble or granite, not sandstone.
Construct the Dry Dock in Brooklyn.
Initiate first survey for the Transcontinental Railroad 1844.
While in Congress he began a movement to complete the Washington Monument, and he also started a practice of hanging the Presidential Portraits in the Rotunda.
The epitaph on Pratt's gravestone reads:

WHILE MEMBER OF CONGRESS
MOVED THE REDUCTION OF POSTAGE
A.D. 1838
AND THE SURVEY FOR A RAILROAD
TO THE PACIFIC A.D. 1844

member of the State Senate in 1830; elected as a Democrat to the Twenty-fifth Congress (March 4, 1837 – March 3, 1839); elected to the twenty-eighth Congress (March 4, 1843 – March 3, 1845); chairman, Committee on Public Buildings and Grounds (twenty-eighth Congress).

Zadock Pratt's wives
Pratt had five wives throughout his life.

His first wife was Beda Dickerman, whom he married in 1818.  She died of tuberculosis seven months later.  In 1821 Pratt married his first wife's sister, Esther Dickerman.  Esther died two and a half years later, also from tuberculosis.  Pratt married his third wife, Abigail P. Watson of Rensselaerville, on January 12, 1829. Pratt had his only children with Abigail, a boy and a girl.  George Watson Pratt was born on April 18, 1831.  Three years later Julia P. Pratt was born on January 26, 1834.  On February 5, 1834 Abigail, Pratt's third wife, died at twenty-eight years old from complications from the birth of her daughter.  Some time later, Pratt married Abigail's sister Mary.  They were married until July 17, 1868 when Mary died of unknown causes.  One year later Pratt married his fifth wife, Susie A. Grimm of Brooklyn, October 16, 1869.  They were married in Grace Episcopal Church, Prattsville; Zadock had given the land and half the money to build the church.  They remained married until Zadock's death.

Later life and death

In 1856, Zadock Pratt, at 66 years old, met a teenage Jay Gould, and hired him to survey a tanning site in Pennsylvania.  Gould found large tracts of hemlock forest for sale, which impressed Pratt, who then made Gould a partner and manager of the new tannery. By another account, Gould decided that he wanted to build a tannery, found a site, and then sought out Pratt's assistance.

There was $120,000 capital for the project, all of which came from Pratt. He left the tannery to Gould, which expanded rapidly, and the surrounding settlement was called Gouldsboro (also spelled Gouldsborough). However, Pratt became dissatisfied with the returns on his investment, and was concerned that Gould was embezzling. Gould had become acquainted with Charles M. Leupp, a rich merchant from New York City, and had convinced Leupp to loan him the money to buy out Pratt's share. Gould offered Pratt $60,000 for his share of the tannery, which Pratt accepted, transferring Pratt's stake to Leupp.

In 1861, Pratt donated to Prattsville the  where Pratt Rock now is.

Death
Pratt became ill with a fever while he and his wife were visiting relatives in Bergen, New Jersey, which had recently been annexed by Jersey City. While recovering he fell down stairs and broke his thigh. He died due to the injury on April 5, 1871. He is buried in the City Cemetery in Prattsville.  Pratt Rock depicts his life through a series of stone carvings.  His former home at Prattsville, the Zadock Pratt House, was listed on the National Register of Historic Places in 1986, and has operated as a house museum since 1959.

Notes

References

Books

Newspaper articles

Websites

External links
 
 The Zadock Pratt Museum
 Zadock Pratt Biographical Information

1790 births
1871 deaths
People from Stephentown, New York
Democratic Party members of the United States House of Representatives from New York (state)
Prattsville, New York
Tanners
People from Greene County, New York
American city founders
19th-century American politicians
Accidental deaths from falls
Accidental deaths in New Jersey